is a Japanese former professional baseball third baseman in Nippon Professional Baseball. He played his entire career for the Lotte Orions from 1969 to 1986. He was the Pacific League Rookie of the Year in 1969.

References

1946 births
Living people
Baseball people from Kōchi Prefecture
Japanese baseball players
Nippon Professional Baseball infielders
Lotte Orions players
Nippon Professional Baseball Rookie of the Year Award winners
Managers of baseball teams in Japan
Chiba Lotte Marines managers